John Derrick Mordaunt Snagge  (8 May 190425 March 1996) was a British newsreader and commentator on BBC Radio.

Life
Born in Chelsea, London, he was educated at Winchester College and Pembroke College, Oxford, where he obtained a degree in law. He then joined the BBC, taking up the position of assistant director at Stoke-on-Trent's new relay station 6ST. He broadcast his first sports commentary (of a Hull City versus Stoke City football match) in January 1927, after the BBC obtained the rights to cover major sporting events.

In 1928, Snagge was transferred to London to work as one of the BBC's main announcers alongside Stuart Hibberd. From 1931 until 1980, he commentated on the annual Oxford-Cambridge Boat Race. He provided commentary for the coronation of King George VI in 1937 and again in 1953 for the coronation of Queen Elizabeth II.

At the start of the Second World War, Snagge was made the BBC's presentation director and delivered important radio announcements as the war unfolded. By the time of the D-Day landings in 1944, he was presenting the magazine programme War Report which featured regular news from the beaches of Normandy. He announced that Allied Armies have started landing "on the northern coast of France" at 9.32 am on 6 June, but without giving the actual location (Normandy).

In the early 1950s, Snagge played a role in negotiations that led to the radio comedy series The Goon Show being commissioned by the BBC. He was also the subject of many running gags during the show, and provided many self-parodying announcements, usually recorded. He also featured as himself in the episode The Greenslade Story, alongside regular announcer Wallace Greenslade. He was a defender of the show against many efforts to cancel it, even to staking his career on it. Later, in the 1970s, he echoed his wartime role by appearing as the newsreader in the radio version of Dad's Army, setting the scene at the beginning of each episode.

He appeared as himself in the 1960 TV Hancock's Half Hour episode, 'The East Cheam Centenary', where he commentates on the street 'procession', from Hancock's bedroom at 23 Railway Cuttings.

Snagge retired in 1965, but continued to provide commentaries for the Boat Race until 1980. The same year his wife Eileen died. Around this time he also appeared on Noel Edmonds's Radio 1 show on Sunday mornings, a role subsequently taken up by Brian Perkins.

When BBC Radio Stoke-on-Trent (now BBC Radio Stoke) was launched in 1968 Snagge introduced the new station by apologising for the break in transmission that had occurred on 30 October 1928, i.e. the close of 6ST, and that it was "due to circumstances beyond our control. Normal transmission has now been resumed".

He voiced the commentary on the Sex Pistols track, Pistols Propaganda, which appeared on the B-side of their single (I'm Not Your) Stepping Stone. The track is the soundtrack to the trailer for their film, The Great Rock 'n' Roll Swindle.

During the 1949 University Boat Race Snagge's voice filled with excitement and he reported: "I can't see who's in the lead but it's either Oxford or Cambridge".

He was the guardian of Wally Hope, founder of the Stonehenge Free Festival, until his premature death in 1975.

John Snagge died in Slough from throat cancer in 1996, aged 91.

Family

Snagge was the son of Sir Thomas Mordaunt Snagge (1868–1955), also known as Judge Mordaunt Snagge, knighted in 1931, and Gwendaline Rose Emily Colomb (1876–1966).

His paternal grandfather was Sir Thomas William Snagge, KCMG (1837–1914). His mother's father was the British naval strategist, Sir John Colomb, KCMG (1838–1909).

He was married twice: firstly, in 1936, to Eileen Mary Joscelyne (the daughter of Harry Percy Joscelyne). She died in 1980. He married, secondly, Joan Wilson in 1982. She predeceased him in 1992.

References

Sources
Oxford Dictionary of National Biography

External links 
 
  at the Radio Academy's Hall of Fame.
 John Snagge announcing the D Day landings, 6 June 1944

1904 births
1996 deaths
British radio personalities
British reporters and correspondents
BBC newsreaders and journalists
Officers of the Order of the British Empire
Alumni of Pembroke College, Oxford
Deaths from cancer in England
Deaths from esophageal cancer
People educated at Winchester College
Articles containing video clips